A list of notable harness horse races which take place annually in Scandinavia, which currently hold Group status in Europe.

Group 1

Group 2

References
 www.uet-trot.eu – 2014 GROUP RACE CALENDAR.
 www.worldclasstrotting.com

Horse racing in Denmark
Horse racing in Finland
Horse racing in Norway
Horse racing in Sweden